A voulge (also spelled vouge, sometimes called a couteau de breche) is a type of polearm that existed in medieval Europe, primarily in 15th century France. A voulge would usually have a narrow single-edged blade mounted with a socket on a shaft. The weapon could additionally feature shaft reinforcements called langets and rondel protection for the hands at the base of the blade. Troops that used the weapon are called voulgiers. It's a weapon noted to have been used by the Franc-Archers and is also depicted in artwork of their creation. There's a popular erroneous definition of the word voulge in modern times, which refers to a pointy cleaver-like weapon blade attached to the shaft with two hoops like a bardiche. This definition is incorrect and started in the 19th century with Viollet le Duc, and the weapon in question is an early form of halberd.

References

Polearms
Medieval blade weapons
Medieval polearms